The Time line of the British Army 1900–1999 lists the conflicts and wars the British Army were involved in.

Boxer Rebellion ended 1901
Anglo-Aro War 1901–1902
Second Boer War ended 1902
World War I 1914–1918
Easter Rising 1916
Third Anglo Marri War 1917
Third Afghan War 1919
Irish War of Independence 1919–1921
World War II 1939–1945
Greek civil war 1946-47
Malayan Emergency 1948–1960
Korean War 1950–1953
Mau Mau Uprising 1952–1960
Cypriot Independence 1955–1959
Suez Crisis 1956–1957
Brunei Revolt 1962–1966
Indonesia–Malaysia confrontation 1962-1966
Dhofar Rebellion 1962–1975
Aden Emergency 1963–1967
The Troubles 1968–1998
Operation Banner 1969–2007
Falklands War 1982
Gulf War 1990–1991
Yugoslav wars 1991–2001
Bosnian War 1992–1995
Kosovo War 1998–1999

See also
Timeline of the British Army
Timeline of the British Army 1700–1799
Timeline of the British Army 1800–1899
Timeline of the British Army since 2000

20th-century conflicts
20th-century history of the British Army
British Army 1900-1999